Melicerona felina, common name the kitten cowrie, is a species of sea snail, a cowry, a marine gastropod mollusk in the family Cypraeidae, the cowries.

Description
Melicerona felina has a shell reaching a size of 10–30 mm. Dorsum has a somewhat banded and spotted pattern with a yellow-brown coloration. It lives under coral slabs on leeward intertidal reefs, at a depth of 2–4 m.

Distribution
This species is distributed in the Red Sea and in the Indian Ocean along Aldabra, Chagos, the Comores, the East Coast of South Africa, Kenya, Madagascar, the Mascarene Basin, Mauritius, Mozambique, Réunion, the Seychelles, Somalia and Tanzania.

References

 Verdcourt, B. (1954). The cowries of the East African Coast (Kenya, Tanganyika, Zanzibar and Pemba). Journal of the East Africa Natural History Society 22(4) 96: 129–144, 17 pls
 Burgess, C.M. (1970). The Living Cowries. AS Barnes and Co, Ltd. Cranbury, New Jersey
 Branch, G.M. et al. (2002). Two Oceans. 5th impression. David Philip, Cape Town & Johannesburg

External links
 
 Encyclopedia of Life
 Cypraea.eu
 Xenophora
 Caledonian shells

Cypraeidae
Gastropods described in 1791
Taxa named by Johann Friedrich Gmelin